Below is a non-exhaustive list of Shia members of parliament in Kuwait.

Shia in the National Assembly
Twelfth (2008-)
Saleh Ashour
Dr. Hassan Jowhar
Sayed Hussein Al-Qallaf
Adnan Abdul Samad
Ahmad Lari

Eleventh (2006-2008)
Ahmed Lari
Saleh Ashour
Adnan Abdul Samad
Dr. Hassan Jowhar

Tenth (2003-2006)
Saleh Ashour
Yousef Al-Zalzala
Hassan Abdulla Jowhar
Hussein Al-Qallaf
Salah Abdulrida Khorshid

Ninth (1999-2003)
Adnan Abdul Samad
Saleh Ashour
Abdul Mohsen Jamal
Hussein Al-Qallaf
Salah Abdulrida Khorshid

Eighth (1996-1999) 
Adnan Abdul Samad
Hussein Ali Al-Qallaf
Hassan Abdulla Jowhar
Abbas Hussein Al-Khdhari
Salah Abdulrida Khorshid

Seventh (1992-1996)
Adnan Abdul Samad
Yacoub Hayati
Ali Ahmad Al-Baghli
Abdul Mohsen Jamal
Nasser Sarkhoh

Sixth (1985-1986)
Yacoub Hayati
Abbas Hussein Al-Khdhari
Nasser Sarkhoh

Fifth (1981-1985)
Adnan Abdul Samad
Mohammed Habib Hassan Bader
Abdul Mohsen Jamal
Issa Mohammed Al-Mazidi
Nasser Sarkhoh

Fourth (1975-1976)
Habib Hassan Jowhar Hayat
Ibrahim Ali Yousef Khraibit
Issa Abdulla Bahman
Ismail Ali Dashti
Khaled Khalaf Al-Tailji
Abdul Muttaleb Al-Kazimi
Jassem Mohammed Al-Qattan
Hussein Makki Al-Jum’ah
Hussein Mohammed Jawad Ma’rafi
Abdulla Yacoub Jassem Al-Wazzan 

Third (1971-1975)
Ibrahim Ali Yousef Khraibit
Sayid Ahmad Sayid Al-Mosawi
Issa Abdulla Bahman
Hassan Jowhar Hayat
Abdul Latif Al-Kazimi
Abdul Muttaleb Al-Kazimi

Second (1967-1970)	
Ibrahim Ali Yousef Khraibit
Issa Abdulla Bahman
Hassan Jowhar Ali Hayat
Mansour Mousa Al-Mazidi
Zaid Abdulhussein Al-Kazimi
Abdul Latif Al-Kazimi
Jassem Ahmad Al-Ostath
Ibrahim Taher Al-Mutawa

First (1963-1967)
Mohammed Hussein Qabazard
Ibrahim Ali Yousef Khraibit
Hassan Jowhar Ali Hayat
Hayder ali murad
Abdulla Ali Dashti
Sayid Ahmad Al-Mosawi
Zaid Abdulhussein Al-Kazimi

National Assembly members

Lists of political office-holders in Kuwait